Harrison Mills is an unincorporated community in Crawford County, in the U.S. state of Missouri.

History
A post office called Harrison's Mills was established in 1832, and remained in operation until 1880. B. Harrison, an early postmaster, gave the community his last name.

References

Unincorporated communities in Crawford County, Missouri
Unincorporated communities in Missouri